The William Parker House is a historic house at 55 Walnut Street in Reading, Massachusetts.  The -story wood-frame house was built c. 1796, was expanded early in the 19th century into a two family residence, and converted back into a single family in the early 20th century.  It is notable for its association with William Parker, a dissenter from the doctrines espoused by the local Congregational Church. In 1849 he joined with other members of his extended family in splitting the congregation.

In 1910 the house was purchased by Walter Scott Hopkins, a Boston merchant. Hopkins hired a local architect, Willard P. Adden, to return the house to its original single-family configuration and restore and renovate the house for use as a family home. Hopkins only owned the house for a few years before selling it to Adden circa 1916, though he too only lived there briefly, moving in 1918. Adden later moved to Woburn Street.

The house was listed on the National Register of Historic Places in 1984.

See also
National Register of Historic Places listings in Reading, Massachusetts
National Register of Historic Places listings in Middlesex County, Massachusetts

References

Houses completed in 1796
Houses on the National Register of Historic Places in Reading, Massachusetts
Houses in Reading, Massachusetts
1796 establishments in Massachusetts
Federal architecture in Massachusetts